António Cândido Gonçalves Crespo (11 March 1846 – 11 June 1883) was a Brazilian-born Portuguese poet.

Biography
Born to a Portuguese father and a slave mother on the outskirts of Rio de Janeiro on 11 March 1846, he moved to Portugal at the age of ten. He was educated at the University of Coimbra, but "devoted himself almost exclusively to the Muses at Lisbon." His poetry was deeply informed by Parnassianism. He occasionally collaborated with his wife Maria Amália Vaz de Carvalho, also a noted writer. 

He died in Lisbon on 11 June 1883, aged 37.

Bibliography
Miniaturas (1870)
Nocturnos (1882) 
Obras Completas (1887)

References

External links
 
Sonnets by Crespo (In Portuguese)

1846 births
1883 deaths
People from Rio de Janeiro (city)
Portuguese people of Brazilian descent
Portuguese male poets
University of Coimbra alumni
People from Lisbon
19th-century Portuguese poets
19th-century male writers
19th-century deaths from tuberculosis
Tuberculosis deaths in Portugal